"Mwaka Moon" is a song by French rapper Kalash featuring Damso and Sfera Ebbasta  released in October 2017. The song reached number one on the French Singles Chart.

Charts

Weekly charts

Year-end charts

Certifications

References

2017 singles
2017 songs
SNEP Top Singles number-one singles